This is an annotated list of social enterprises sufficiently notable to have a Wikipedia article,  in alphabetical order. For quick navigation, click on one of the letters:



A
Aarong
Acumen
Appropriate Infrastructure Development Group
Aravind Eye Hospitals
Ashoka

B
Barefoot College
Benetech
Better World Books
Bharat Financial Inclusion Limited
BioLite
BookBox
BRAC

C
CAP Markets
Care2
Casa Mesita
Change.org
Charity Checkout
CharityVillage.com
Chavez for Charity
Chemonics
Cherie Amie
Closing the Loop
Comic Relief
Cycling Without Age

D
Deep Springs International
Defy Ventures
DuckDuckGo

E
Ecosia
Elephant Parade
Enercoop
Engine No. 1
Envirofit International

F
Fair Trade USA
Five Talents
FlipGive

G
Grassroots Business Fund
Grameen Bank
Grama Vidiyal
Greyston Bakery

H
Higher Ground
Housing Works
Husk Power Systems
HVAC (organization)

I
Institute for OneWorld Health

J
Jaipur Rugs

K
Kiva

L
LifeStraw
Locast

M
Masarang Foundation
Me to We
MicroConsignment

N

Newman's Own
Nuru International

O
One Acre Fund
Orangi Pilot Project
865utfluf

P
PAMbio
Partners In Health
Pratham
Proximity Designs

R
RepaNet

S
Samasource
Schwab Foundation for Social Entrepreneurship
Sea Ranger Service
SEKEM
Shristi
SIRUM

T
TeachAids
TerraCycle
Toms Shoes
Top Third Ventures
Trew Era Cafe
ThankYou
Tony's Chocolonely

W
WakaWaka

Y 
Yunus Social Business – Global Initiatives